Statement on Auditing Standards (SAS) No. 55: Consideration of Internal Control in a Financial Statement Audit, commonly abbreviated as SAS 55, is an auditing statement issued by the Auditing Standards Board of the American Institute of Certified Public Accountants (AICPA) in April 1988. It requires the auditor to obtain an understanding of an entity’s internal control sufficient to plan any audit on such entity.  Identifying and evaluating relevant controls is an important step in the user auditor’s overall audit approach.

External links
AICPA
Auditing Standards Board

Auditing in the United States
Auditing standards